2021 World Cup may refer to:

2021 Men's Rugby League World Cup
2021 Rugby League World Cup
2021 Women's Rugby League World Cup
Chess World Cup 2021
Women's Chess World Cup 2021